A Saccheri quadrilateral (also known as a Khayyam–Saccheri quadrilateral) is a quadrilateral with two equal sides perpendicular to the base. It is named after Giovanni Gerolamo Saccheri, who used it extensively in his book Euclides ab omni naevo vindicatus (literally Euclid Freed of Every Flaw) first published in 1733, an attempt to prove the parallel postulate using the method Reductio ad absurdum. The Saccheri quadrilateral may occasionally be referred to as the Khayyam–Saccheri quadrilateral, in reference to the 11th century Persian scholar Omar Khayyam.

For a Saccheri quadrilateral ABCD, the sides AD and BC (also called the legs) are equal in length, and also perpendicular to the base AB. The top CD is the summit or upper base and the angles at C and D are called the summit angles.

The advantage of using Saccheri quadrilaterals when considering the parallel postulate is that they place the mutually exclusive options in very clear terms:

Are the summit angles right angles, obtuse angles, or acute angles?

As it turns out:
 when the summit angles are right angles, the existence of this quadrilateral is equivalent to the statement expounded by Euclid's fifth postulate.
When the summit angles are acute, this quadrilateral leads to hyperbolic geometry, and 
when the summit angles are obtuse, the quadrilateral leads to elliptical or spherical geometry (provided that also some other modifications are made to the postulates).

Saccheri himself, however, thought that both the obtuse and acute cases could be shown to be contradictory. He did show that the obtuse case was contradictory, but failed to properly handle the acute case.

History
While the quadrilaterals are named for Giovanni Gerolamo Saccheri, they were considered in the works of earlier mathematicians. Saccheri's first proposition states that if two equal lines AC and BC form equal angles with the line AB, the angles at CD will equal each other; a version of this statement appears in the works of the ninth century scholar Thabit ibn Qurra. Rectifying the Curved, a 14th century treatise written in Castile, builds off the work of Thabit ibn Qurra and also contains descriptions of Saccheri quadrilaterals. Omar Khayyam (1048-1131) described them in the late 11th century in Book I of his Explanations of the Difficulties in the Postulates of Euclid. Unlike many commentators on Euclid before and after him (including of course Saccheri), Khayyam was not trying to prove the parallel postulate as such but to derive it from an equivalent postulate he formulated from "the principles of the Philosopher" (Aristotle):

Two convergent straight lines intersect and it is impossible for two convergent straight lines to diverge in the direction in which they converge.

Khayyam then considered the three cases right, obtuse, and acute that the summit angles of a Saccheri quadrilateral can take and after proving a number of theorems about them, he (correctly) refuted the obtuse and acute cases based on his postulate and hence derived the classic postulate of Euclid.

The 17th century Italian mathematician Giordano Vitale used the quadrilateral in his Euclide restituo (1680, 1686) to prove that if three points are equidistant on the base AB and the summit CD, then AB and CD are everywhere equidistant.

Saccheri himself based the whole of his long and ultimately flawed proof of the parallel postulate around the quadrilateral and its three cases, proving many theorems about its properties along the way.

Saccheri quadrilaterals in hyperbolic geometry

Let ABCD be a Saccheri quadrilateral having AB as base, CD as summit and CA and DB as the equal sides that are perpendicular to the base. The following properties are valid in any Saccheri quadrilateral in hyperbolic geometry:

 The summit angles (the angles at C and D) are equal and acute.
 The summit is longer than the base. 
 Two Saccheri quadrilaterals are congruent if:
 the base segments and summit angles are congruent
 the summit segments and summit angles are congruent.
 The line segment joining the midpoint of the base and the midpoint of the summit:
 Is perpendicular to the base and the summit,
 is the only line of symmetry of the quadrilateral,
 is the shortest segment connecting base and summit,
 is perpendicular to  the line joining the midpoints of the sides, 
 divides the Saccheri quadrilateral into two Lambert quadrilaterals.
 The line segment joining the midpoints of the sides is not perpendicular to either side.

Equations 
In the hyperbolic plane of constant curvature , the summit  of a Saccheri quadrilateral can be calculated from the leg  and the base  using the formula

Tilings in the Poincaré disk model 
Tilings of the Poincaré disk model of the Hyperbolic plane exist having Saccheri quadrilaterals as fundamental domains. Besides the 2 right angles, these quadrilaterals have acute summit angles. The tilings exhibit a *nn22 symmetry (orbifold notation), and include:

See also
Lambert quadrilateral

Notes

References
 
 
M. J. Greenberg, Euclidean and Non-Euclidean Geometries: Development and History, 4th edition, W. H. Freeman, 2008.
George E. Martin, The Foundations of Geometry and the Non-Euclidean Plane, Springer-Verlag, 1975

Hyperbolic geometry
Types of quadrilaterals